Salto River is a river of Costa Rica.

The river originates in the foothills of the Guanacaste Mountains, draining southwesterly to join the Tempisque River.

References

Rivers of Costa Rica